Alon Hazan (born 14 September 1967) is an Israeli former footballer and manager who manages the senior Israel national team. As a player, he played as a midfielder.

Biography
Alon Hazan was raised in Ashdod, Israel, to an observant Masorti Jewish family.

Outside of football he studied for a degree in politics.

Club career
Hazan spent most of his playing career in Israel, but did spend 18 months with English club Watford, with whom he achieved two promotions – from Division Two to the English Premier League. In 1999 Hazan scored in the penalty-shootout semi-final play-off against Birmingham City to put Watford into the play-off final against Bolton Wanderers, which they won 2–0 at Wembley, to earn promotion to the Premier League. He turned home to Israel, for personal reasons, before he could play a part in the top tier of English football.

International career
As a  football player, Hazan capped 72 times and scored 5 goals for the senior Israel, between 1990 and 2000.

Managerial career
As of 8 May 2022, Hazan is the official national head coach who manages the senior Israel national team.

Honours
 Toto Cup: 1985–86, 1989–90, 1990–91, 1993–94
 Israel State Cup: 1992, 1993, 1995
 Liga Leumit: 1993–94

See also
List of Jewish footballers
List of Jews in sports
List of Jews in sports (non-players)
List of Israelis

Managerial Statistics

References

External links
 

1967 births
Living people
Israeli Jews
Jewish footballers
Israeli footballers
Israel international footballers
Israeli football managers
Hapoel Ashdod F.C. players
Hapoel Petah Tikva F.C. players
Maccabi Haifa F.C. players
Hapoel Tel Aviv F.C. players
Maccabi Ironi Ashdod F.C. players
Watford F.C. players
F.C. Ashdod players
Israeli expatriate footballers
Expatriate footballers in England
Israeli expatriate sportspeople in England
Footballers from Ashdod
Liga Leumit players
Israeli Premier League players
F.C. Ashdod managers
Association football midfielders
Israel national football team managers
Israeli Football Hall of Fame inductees